The Wissahickon School District is a public school district in Montgomery County, Pennsylvania. The school district serves the borough of Ambler, and the townships of Lower Gwynedd and Whitpain, all Philadelphia suburbs. The district currently enrolls 4,546 students.

District schools
Blue Bell Elementary School enrolls 420
Lower Gwynedd Elementary School enrolls 563
Shady Grove Elementary School enrolls 604
Stony Creek Elementary School enrolls 514
Wissahickon Middle School enrolls 1,067
Wissahickon High School enrolls 1,378

References

External links
 

School districts in Montgomery County, Pennsylvania